Doralice is a female first name. It is often truncated to Dora or Alice in English. It may refer to:

Doralice (footballer)
Doralice in Orlando furioso by Ludovico Ariosto, who seems to have created the name in 1516
Doralice in story 1.4 "Tebaldo and Doralice" (or simply "Doralice") of The Facetious Nights of Straparola by Giovanni Francesco Straparola, written in 1550
Doralice in John Dryden's comedy, Marriage à la mode, written in 1672. 
Doralice in Antonio Salieri's opera Il ricco d'un giorno, written in 1784
"Doralice" – a song composed by Dorival Caymmi and later covered on João Gilberto's 1960 bossa nova album "O Amor, o Sorriso e a Flor"

References